K. Lyra-Lierse (full official name at the Royal Belgian Football Association: K. Lyra-Lierse Berlaar), formerly known as K. Lyra T.S.V., is a Belgian association football club team from Lier that was created in 1972 to continue the former team Koninklijke Lyra that merged in the same year with another team (Koninklijke Lierse Sportkring). The team colours are yellow-black at home and red-white for away games.

In 2018, K. Lierse S.K. went bankrupt and negotiations between Lyra and fans of Lierse took place to create a club where the soul and spirit of both Lierse and Lyra would be represented. Also the youth teams of Lierse were integrated into the structure of K. Lyra-Lierse. To highlight this collaboration the name was changed to K. Lyra-Lierse, adding the mandatory "Berlaar" to refer to the place where the matches are currently being played.

The club has a strong community focus and fan-driven culture by having 2 supporters, who are democratically elected, represented on the Board. Next to that, fans of the club have a veto on the club's "identity elements" (such as the name, the colours, the location of the stadium, etc.) and pre-emption rights on shares of the club.

Lyra is the Latin name for Lier.

See also
K. Lyra, a previous (1909–1972) club
 K. Lyra T.S.V., a previous (1972–2018) club
K. Lierse S.K.

Results

References 

Football clubs in Belgium
Association football clubs established in 1972
1972 establishments in Belgium
Lier, Belgium
Sport in Antwerp Province